Javier "Javi" Martínez Calvo (born 22 December 1999) is a Spanish footballer who plays as a winger for SD Huesca, on loan from CA Osasuna.

Club career
Born in Ólvega, Soria, Castile and León, Martínez represented CA Osasuna as a youth. On 2 November 2016, aged only 16, he made his senior debut with the reserves by coming on as a second-half substitute in a 1–2 Segunda División B home loss against Racing de Ferrol.

On 8 September 2017, Martínez extended his contract until 2022. He scored his first senior goal nine days later, netting his team's first in a 2–2 draw at CD Lealtad.

Martínez made his professional debut on 31 May 2019, replacing goalscorer Xisco in a 3–2 away success over Córdoba CF in the Segunda División, as his side was already promoted. His La Liga debut occurred on 19 July of the following year, as he replaced fellow youth graduate Kike Barja late into a 2–2 home draw against RCD Mallorca.

Martínez scored his first professional goal on 17 January 2021, netting the opener in a 2–0 away win over RCD Espanyol, for the season's Copa del Rey. His first goal in the main category occurred on 21 April, as he again netted the opener in a 3–1 success over Valencia CF also at the El Sadar Stadium.

On 1 September 2022, Martínez was loaned to Albacete Balompié in the second division, for one year. The following 31 January, he moved to fellow league team SD Huesca also in a temporary deal.

Career statistics

Club

Honours
Osasuna
Segunda División: 2018–19

References

External links
Osasuna profile 

1999 births
Living people
Sportspeople from the Province of Soria
Spanish footballers
Footballers from Castile and León
Association football wingers
La Liga players
Segunda División players
Segunda División B players
Tercera División players
CA Osasuna B players
CA Osasuna players
Albacete Balompié players
SD Huesca footballers
Spain youth international footballers